The Tower House or Azuma Residence (塔の家 - Tō no i.e.) was built in 1966 in a very small plot of land by Japanese architect Takamitsu Azuma. The concrete structure was erected on a 20-square-meter plot of land and grows around the stairs six levels up to provide 65 square meters of living space. From the moment of its creation, it was regarded as a symbol of living in a modern metropolis center.

Designed as a continual vertical room for the architect's own family, the staircase appears as the most significant structure in the house's interior. It connects the individual rooms, which are "piled" one on top of the other without any doors separating them.

The building has become a fascinating portrait of how the Japanese society has dealt with the urban and social changes in the last few decades.
"When completed, it was the "skyscraper" of Jingumae, nowadays it is a miniature house"

References

Notes 

Houses in Japan
Houses completed in 1966
1966 establishments in Japan
Residential buildings in Tokyo